Mark Borchardt (born August 20, 1966) is an American independent filmmaker. He is best known as the subject of the 1999 film American Movie, which documented three years he spent writing, shooting and editing his horror short, Coven (1997).

Early life
Borchardt was born and raised in Milwaukee, Wisconsin. His mother, Monica, is Swedish. He started making films at the age of fourteen with a super-8 camera that was given to him by a man who lived down the street from him. After serving three years in the military, he continued his cinematic endeavors at the local university. In the mid-nineties, he wrote and produced Halloween radio dramas which were broadcast annually and won a fellowship from the Milwaukee Art Futures Board.

Career
Filmmakers Chris Smith and Sarah Price began filming Borchardt while he was attempting to put together funding for his unfinished feature Northwestern. After the project collapsed, Borchardt decided instead to finish Coven, which he had started years earlier. After Coven was completed, Smith and Price compiled their footage into American Movie, which was picked up by Sony Classics and won the Grand Jury Prize at the 1999 Sundance Film Festival.

Since then Borchardt has been active appearing on television and in movies. Borchardt has made five appearances on Late Show with David Letterman, including serving as Letterman's 2000 election correspondent. He made several TV appearances on The Show with No Name, a show in Austin, TX, between 2000 and 2003. In 2004, he played himself in a cameo appearance on the television cartoon series Family Guy, along with friend and American Movie co-star Mike Schank. He and Mike also have their own series on Zero TV, Mark and Mike and in, 2006, Mark and Mike hosted a national television special called Night of the Living Dead: LIVE from Wisconsin on Halloween night.

Borchardt has appeared in several movies, including The One (2001), The Tunnel (2001), Abby Singer, & The Godfather of Green Bay (2005). Borchardt also starred in Modus Operandi (2009), played a gravedigger in the partially animated comedy Hamlet A.D.D. (2014), had a leading role in the horror feature The Hagstone Demon (2011), and played Mr. Englan in the directorial debut of fellow Milwaukee filmmaker Jozef K. Richards, The Amateur Monster Movie (2011). In addition, Borchardt also made a cameo in the music video for the Leslie and the Ly's song "Zombie Killer" featuring Elvira, Mistress of the Dark on guest vocals.

He has contributed to Kevin Lindenmuth's 2001 book, The Independent Film Experience and had his short stories published in magazines. Borchardt is one of a trio of hosts on "Cinema Fireside," a weekly film discussion show on WXRW 104.1 in Milwaukee.

In 2004, he announced he would direct Scare Me and sent out casting calls. In 2008, he announced a 2009 release date, which was originally slated for a 2005 release. As of Summer 2010 the movie was still in production and as of 2021, it still has not been released. In April 2012, Borchardt stated that about 65% of the film had been shot, and that he was happy with the first forty pages of the script. However, he maintained parts of the script needed to be revised and while he had rough-cut some of the footage, there was no completion date in place for the project. According to a March 2013 update for the Scare Me IMDb page, the release date has been set for April 1, 2014.

In 2018 he directed a documentary called The Dundee Project, which focused on attendees of a UFO festival in Wisconsin. The film premiered at Slamdance Film Festival (Park City), then played at Fantastic Fest (Austin), Nighthawk Cinema (Brooklyn), and the Chicago Critics Film Festival.

Personal life
Borchardt has three children.

Filmography

As writer/director

As actor/subject

Music videos

References

External links
 
 
 Northwestproductions.com Borchardt's former production website
 (At the Internet Archive, 2003 and earlier; extensive use of Java applets for navigation.)

1966 births
Living people
American male screenwriters
American male film actors
Filmmakers from Milwaukee
People from Menomonee Falls, Wisconsin
American people of Swedish descent
Male actors from Wisconsin
Film directors from Wisconsin
Screenwriters from Wisconsin